The Omaha Heart was a women's American football team in the Legends Football League (LFL) based in Ralston, Nebraska, a suburb of Omaha. The team played two home games per season at the Ralston Arena.

The team was formed in 2012 as a member of the Lingerie Football League for the 2013 season, after the league shifted to a spring and summer schedule. The team's name was chosen in a contest from 12,000 votes. Before the 2013 season began, the league rebranded to the Legends Football League.

Following the 2019 season, the LFL ceased operations and relaunched as the Extreme Football League (X League) for the 2020 season. All former LFL teams received new brands and the Heart were replaced by the Omaha Red Devils. The 2020 season was postponed and the Omaha Red Devils never played as the brand was relocated as the Arizona Red Devils for the 2021 season.

References

External links
 

Legends Football League US teams
American football teams in Nebraska
Sports in Omaha, Nebraska
American football teams established in 2012
2012 establishments in Nebraska
2020 disestablishments in Nebraska
American football teams disestablished in 2020
Women's sports in Nebraska